Interplay Records is a jazz record company and label founded by Toshiya Taenaka in association with Fred Norseworthy in Los Angeles in 1977 which released several notable albums by Warne Marsh, Al Haig, Sal Mosca, Horace Tapscott, and Ted Curson. The label was named after an album released on Taenaka's short-lived label, Seabreeze Records; Al Haig's Interplay.

DiscographyJazzlists: Interplay Records discography: 7700 series, accessed March 19, 2018

References

American record labels
Jazz record labels
Record labels established in 1977
American companies established in 1977
Record labels based in California
Companies based in Los Angeles
1977 establishments in California